The Age Short Story Award is a competition that is run in conjunction with International PEN, the international writers' association. It was established in 1979. From 1979 to 1984 it was run in conjunction with Tabloid Story and was known as The Age-Tabloid Story Awards. The inaugural award was won by Harris Smart. Entries must be unpublished, and under 3000 words. Three prizes are awarded and the winning stories are published in The Age and online.

Winners

References

Serge Liberman
Writers Come of Age 

Australian fiction awards
Short story awards
Awards established in 1979